The Hamilton Watch Complex is a former industrial complex in Lancaster, Pennsylvania. It was owned by the Hamilton Watch Company and was used as their headquarters from the company's founding in 1892, until 1980. The complex was listed on the National Register of Historic Places in 1982. The main building was converted into a luxury apartment and condominium complex.  The Administrative Offices now home to a Montessori School.

Design 
The complex is located on the western edge of the city of Lancaster on Pennsylvania Route 462 (Columbia Avenue). Twin  clock towers are the most dominant feature of the building. Each tower is topped with a mansard roof trimmed with copper and a clock with four faces. The four-story complex was built out of brick and is shaped roughly like an 'E' with the main portion of building situated east–west, paralleling Columbia Avenue, and three wings extend north. An unconnected, four-story, Art Deco office building stands south of the main building, located between the two clock towers. The westernmost wing of the complex was designed in a "restrained" International style.

History 
The Adams and Perry Watch Manufacturing Company was formed in September 1874 and started construction on the original building in the complex, which was completed in July 1875. The building, designed by Chicago-architect Clarence Luther Stiles in the Second Empire style, was three stories high and consisted of only the eastern tower, flanked on either side with a wing. The company went bankrupt in 1876 and, after several years of attempts to organize a new company, the Keystone Standard Watch Company was started in 1886. Keystone Standard Watch went bankrupt, as well, in 1890 and its assets sold in 1892 in a public auction to group of investors from Lancaster, who had also bought another bankrupt watch company in Aurora, Illinois. They founded the Hamilton Watch Company on December 14, 1892.

In 1902, the western wing was extended and a fourth floor was added to entire building, as well as an extension of the clock tower and modification of its mansard roof, in 1905. The complex was repeatedly expanded in the early 1910s, ending in 1916 with the construction of the second clock tower. An addition was constructed in 1923 on the eastern end of the building. An extension was built, extending north from the western clock tower, in 1925 to 1926 and another, extending west from the same tower, in 1929. Various landscaping projects were also undertaken during the 1920s. A new factory wing was constructed in 1936 situated behind the original 1874 clock tower. The four-story office building located between the two clock towers was built in 1941, along with another wing extending north from the end of the 1929 addition. The final addition of the complex was completed in 1963, with the construction of another wing adjacent to the 1941 wing.

Renovation 

In 1980, the Hamilton Watch Company was renamed Hamilton Technology and was moved out of the complex, into downtown Lancaster. A proposal was put forth in 1981 by a Philadelphia-based real estate developer to convert the complex into 202 apartments and 61 townhouses, but it fell through; its failure being blamed on "high interest rates and restrictive zoning regulations". Another developer bought the site in 1983, however that project halted in 1984 by a "legal dispute", leaving 78 units unfinished and dozens more only partially completed. A Montessori school was opened in the 1941 office building in autumn of 1995. The complex was sold to a Baltimore-based developer in 1998 with plans to convert the existing apartments into luxury apartment and condominiums at a cost of $8 million. The final phase of the renovations of the main building was completed in July 2000; a total 135 condos were constructed in the building. The 1941 and 1963 wings were sold to the city in 1999; after a $4.5 renovation, the wings were leased to an insurance company in 2003. The complex was listed on the National Register of Historic Places on August 14, 1982 and was designated a contributing property to the Lancaster City Historic District on September 7, 2001.

See also 

 National Register of Historic Places listings in Lancaster, Pennsylvania

References

Sources 

 
 
 
 
 
 

Industrial buildings completed in 1963
Apartment buildings in Pennsylvania
Buildings and structures in Lancaster, Pennsylvania
Clock towers in Pennsylvania
Residential condominiums in the United States
Residential buildings on the National Register of Historic Places in Pennsylvania
Industrial buildings and structures on the National Register of Historic Places in Pennsylvania
International style architecture in Pennsylvania
Manufacturing plants in the United States
Second Empire architecture in Pennsylvania
Twin towers
Historic district contributing properties in Pennsylvania
National Register of Historic Places in Lancaster, Pennsylvania